Pickwick Park is an unincorporated community in Turkey Creek Township, Kosciusko County, in the U.S. state of Indiana.

Geography

References

Unincorporated communities in Kosciusko County, Indiana
Unincorporated communities in Indiana